Nudes most commonly refers to depictions of unclothed people, see Nude (art) and Nude photography.

It may also refer to: 
 Skin or flesh coloured pantyhose, mostly used in films or modeling
 Nudes, a 2001 album by Nathan Moore (American musician) as part of the folk rock band The Amusement (stylized "ThaMuseMeant")

See also 
 Nudity
 Nude (disambiguation)